Nectomys rattus, the small-footed bristly mouse, Amazonian nectomys, Amazonian mouse, or common water rat is a species of rodent in the genus Nectomys of family Cricetidae. It is found in Brazil, Colombia, French Guiana, Guyana, Suriname, and Venezuela, where it lives in a variety of habitats including lowland tropical rainforest, cerrado and caatinga. It is mainly found in areas close to water. It was recognized as distinct only in 2000 and its limits with other Nectomys, including Nectomys apicalis and Nectomys squamipes, remain unclear.

References

Literature cited

Nectomys
Mammals described in 1883
Taxa named by August von Pelzeln
Taxonomy articles created by Polbot